Chilliwack Coliseum (formerly known as Prospera Centre) is a 5,000-seat multi-purpose arena in Chilliwack, British Columbia, Canada, built in 2004 as a replacement of the former Chilliwack Coliseum. It is the home of the Chilliwack Chiefs of the British Columbia Hockey League (BCHL) after the Quesnel Millionaires were moved from Quesnel, British Columbia for the start of the 2011–12 BCHL season, as well as the Chilliwack Sports Hall of Fame. Previously, it was the home of the Chilliwack Bruins of the Western Hockey League from 2006 to 2011 and the previous incarnation of the Chilliwack Chiefs of the BCHL from 1990 to 2006. It has also hosted other events, including concerts, ice shows, trade shows, and conventions.  Prior to the opening of Abbotsford Centre in 2009, the then-named Prospera Centre was the dominant concert venue in the Fraser Valley.

In February 2019, Prospera Credit Union announced they would be ceasing their sponsorship of the arena. In September 2019, the Chiefs Development Group (CDG) announced that the facility would be renamed the Chilliwack Coliseum as part of a 5-year agreement between the CDG and the City of Chilliwack.

References

External links
Official website

British Columbia Hockey League arenas
Indoor arenas in British Columbia
Indoor ice hockey venues in British Columbia
Sport in Chilliwack
Sports venues in British Columbia
Western Hockey League arenas
Sports venues completed in 2004
2004 establishments in British Columbia